There is a large national community of Ukrainians in the Czech Republic. The Ukrainian national minority in the Czech Republic together with the citizens of Ukraine make up the largest membership base with more than 203,198 members.

Labour migration from Ukraine or southeast Slovakia to what is now the Czech Republic began to grow to a large scale in the early 1990s. In 1991, there were just 8,500 Ukrainian citizens on Czech territory. However, figures of the Czech Statistical Office showed that number had grown to 132,481, making Ukrainians the largest group of foreigners in the Czech Republic, with a 30% share of the foreign population.

Czech registered public organizations with the status of a legal entity  

 International association "Ukrainian Freedom", president: Bohdan Kostiv. Official pages
 International non-governmental organization "Coordination Resource Center", General director: Olexandr Petrenko. Official pages
 Rodyna, z.s., leader: Yosyp Klymkovych. Official pages
 Společnost Ivana Kondura, leaders: Jiří Klán, Petr Novák, Lenka Kondurová. Official pages
 Ukrainian Business Club in Czech Republic z.s., chairman: Taras Yakubovskyi
 Ukrajinská iniciativa v České republice, z.s., leaders: Viktor Rajčinec. Official pages
 Ukrajinská iniciativa jižní Moravy z.s., leaders: Marija Wazi-Nobilisová. Official pages
Ukrajinská tradice v České republice, z.s., leader: Bohdan Rajčinec. Mirror of Ukrajinská iniciativa v České republice; same location, same statutes etc.
 Misie Ukrajinské Pravoslavné Církve v České republice, z.s., leaders: Oleksandr Schramko
 Ukrajinské kulturní a informační centrum, start 9 March 1996.

The main activities of international organizations, in particular, the "International non-governmental organization “Coordination Resource Center”" also include issues of the electoral process in Ukraine and monitoring it.

Ukrainian mass media in the Czech Republic
CRCMedia — European Diaspora News
Ukrainian newspapers in the Czech Republic — Ukrainian news in the Czechia
JARMART - cultural and historical newsletter — Ukrainian portal, news, video, internet

Periodicals in Ukrainian
Porohy — political and cultural magazine in Ukrainian, sometimes in Czech
Ukrainian journal — journal in Czech or Ukrainian
Mandrivnyk - Czech and Ukrainian literary magazine - magazine in Ukrainian

Notes

Bibliography

An English version was also presented as a conference paper,

Further reading

See also
 Ruthenians and Ukrainians in Czechoslovakia (1918–1938)
 Ukrainians in Slovakia
 Czech Republic–Ukraine relations

Ethnic groups in the Czech Republic
Czech Republic
 
Ukrainian diaspora in Europe